The Coastal Carolina Chanticleers men's basketball team is the men's basketball team that represents Coastal Carolina University in Conway, South Carolina, United States. The school's team currently competes in the Sun Belt Conference. Tony Dunkin, a former Chanticleer, is the only men's basketball player in NCAA Division I history to be named the conference player of the year all four seasons he played.

Postseason history
Coastal Carolina has competed in the NCAA tournament four times and have a record of 0–4. In 1991, the Chanticleers were a 15-seed and lost 79–69 to Indiana. In 1993, the team was a 16-seed and lost 84–53 to Michigan; Michigan later vacated the victory. The Chanticleers next appeared in 2014, as a 16-seed, losing to first-seed Virginia, 70–59. In 2015, after beating Winthrop 81–70 for the Big South championship, the team made their second consecutive NCAA Tournament appearance. Again a 16-seed, the Chanticleers lost to eventual tournament runner-up Wisconsin, 86–72.

The Chanticleers have also appeared in two National Invitation Tournaments, where they have a record of 0–2, two CollegeInsider.com Postseason Tournaments, where they have a record of 3–2, and one College Basketball Invitational, where they have a record of 4–2.

NCAA tournament results

*Michigan's win later vacated.
Note: From 2011 to 2015, the tournament's First Round consisted of the First Four play-in games.

National Invitation Tournament results

CollegeInsider.com Postseason Tournament results

College Basketball Invitational results
The Chanticleers have appeared in the College Basketball Invitational three times. Their combined record is 8–4.

The Basketball Classic results
The Chanticleers have appeared in The Basketball Classic one time. Their record is 3-1.

Current coaching staff

Head coaching history

Conference affiliations
 Big South Conference (1985–86 to 2015–16)
 Sun Belt Conference (2016–17 to present)

Source:

References

External links